Ingrid Fickler (born October 27, 1940 in Zagreb) is a German jurist and politician, representative of the Christian Social Union of Bavaria.

She was a member of the Landtag of Bavaria between 1994 and 2008. From 1993 to 1995 she was a member of the party executive of the CSU.

See also
List of Bavarian Christian Social Union politicians

References

Jurists from Bavaria
Christian Social Union in Bavaria politicians
1940 births
Living people